Love Under the Full Moon is a 2021 Chinese television series, starring Ju Jingyi and Zheng Yecheng, it aired on August 26 to September 8, 2021. The series is part of iQIYI's Sweet on Theater, an iQIYI original lineup of romantic television series.

Synopsis 
Due to a cosmic phenomenon caused by a super full moon, Lei Chuxia (Ju Jingyi) and Xu Xiaodong (Zheng Yecheng) meet and fall in love after travelling through time and space. As the "Dong-Xia" couple experiences hilarious and sweet moments, they begin to find out more about their connection from ten years ago and realize their encounter was truly fortuitous. With perseverance and dedication, they overcome obstacles in their way and ultimately receive a happy ending.

Cast and characters
Main cast
 Ju Jingyi as Lei Chuxia, owns a dessert shop called Summer Time with Yuan
 Zheng Yecheng as Xu Xiaodong, famous mysterious game designer Winter

Supporting cast
 Merxat as Wei Xuanhe, Lei's fiancé ten years ago
 Sun Yining as Yuan Yuan, Lei's best friend
 Shen Yao as Qin Yue, a famous host
 Zheng Fanxing as Jin Xiaorui, Xu's best friend

Production 
The series began filming in November 2020, and wrapped up in February 2021.

References

External links 

2021 Chinese television series debuts
IQIYI original programming